Ban Haeng is a tambon (subdistrict) of Ngao District, in Lampang Province, Thailand. In 2019 it had a total population of 6,219 people.

Administration

Central administration
The tambon is subdivided into 8 administrative villages (muban).

Local administration
The whole area of the subdistrict is covered by the subdistrict administrative organization (SAO) Ban Haeng (องค์การบริหารส่วนตำบลบ้านแหง).

References

External links
Thaitambon.com on Ban Haeng

Tambon of Lampang province
Populated places in Lampang province